Gerda Madvig (Copenhagen, April 14, 1868 - Charlottenlund, September 10, 1940) was a Danish sculptress and painter.

Biography
Gerda Madvig was born Gerda Heyman to the Jewish-Danish industrialist and  Philip Wulff Heyman, co-founder of Tuborg Brewery and pioneer of Danish butter and bacon exports, and his wife Hanne Emilie Adler, both Danish Jews with roots in Germany.

Career

Madvig learned to draw with the painter and illustrator Carl Thomsen, and then to model with professor August Saabye, with whom she worked for four to five years. In 1892, she exhibited at the annual Charlottenborg Spring Exhibition her first piece, En kvinde, and in 1893 Sovende barn. Later, modeled a body-sized figure, called Asra and some busts, among others, one of her sister Jenny, who was married to the painter Georg Seligmann.
Madvig also played music and gave concerts in Paris, where she lived from 1903 until shortly before her death.

Style

Madvig used especially family members as models, but also famous people, both contemporaries, like Professor Julius Petersen, and deceased, such as the composer Frédéric Chopin. As a sculptor, she was a naturalist, while her painting was mostly influenced by French Impressionism.

Personal life
She married the painter Charles William Madvig on 16 May, 1905, in Paris. They had one daughter, the art dealer Edith Madvig Fersing.

Death
Madvig died in 1940. She is buried at Hellerup Cemetery.

Works

Sculpture
En kvinde ("A woman", 1892)
Sovende barn ("Sleeping Child", 1893)
Moderen (relief, 1902-03)
Asra (figure)
Dyrestatuetter (bronze)
La vigilance (bronze, ca. 1937)
Kristus (1938)
Statuetter af datteren Edith

Busts
Julius Petersen (plaster, University of Copenhagen )
Jenny Seligmann, born Heyman
Hanne Heyman (marble)
Jens Ferdinand Willumsen (Paris, 1904)
Frédéric Chopin (1933)
Roger Garreau
Charles Madvig
Pierre d'Arquennes (who headed the École Normale de Musique de Paris before Pierre Petit).
Aage Louis Dessau

Paintings
Fiskehavn i Nordfrankrig (exhibited in 1928)

References

Danish Jews
19th-century Danish sculptors
19th-century Danish painters

Burials at Hellerup Cemetery